Juho Kusti Paasikivi's cabinet was the 29th government of Republic of Finland. Cabinet's time period was from November 17, 1944 to April 17, 1945 . It was a majority government.

Paasikivi's second cabinet's main tasks where to create jobs for ex-soldiers.  The Lapland war continued as German Army had to be pushed away from  Northern Finland. Allied Commission had the main power in the country led by Soviet Union. War in Europe continued.

Cabinet members
The members of the Paasikivi's cabinet were as follows:

References

External links

 

Paasikivi, 2
1944 establishments in Finland
1945 disestablishments in Finland
Cabinets established in 1944
Cabinets disestablished in 1945